Trinchesia albopunctata is a species of sea slug, an aeolid nudibranch, a marine gastropod mollusk in the family Trinchesiidae.

Distribution
This species was described from Ischia, Gulf of Naples, Italy. It has subsequently been reported from the east coast of Spain.

References 

 Schmekel L. (1968). Vier neue Cuthonidae aus dem Mittelmeer (Gastr. Nudibr.): Trinchesia albopunctata n. sp., Trinchesia miniostriata n. sp., Trinchesia ilonae n. sp. und Catriona maua Marcus & Marcus, 1960. Pubblicazioni della Stazione Zoologica di Napoli 36: 437-457 page(s): 439
 Gofas, S.; Le Renard, J.; Bouchet, P. (2001). Mollusca. in: Costello, M.J. et al. (eds), European Register of Marine Species: a check-list of the marine species in Europe and a bibliography of guides to their identification. Patrimoines Naturels. 50: 180-213

Trinchesiidae
Gastropods described in 1968